Thomas Hill Peregrine Furye Lowe (21 December 1781 – 17 January 1861) was an English cleric. He was Dean of Exeter from 1839  to his death.

Life
He was the son of Thomas Humphrey Lowe and Lucy Hill, daughter of Thomas Hill. He matriculated at Trinity College, Oxford in 1799, graduating B.A. in 1803, and M.A. in 1805. In 1804 he entered Lincoln's Inn.

Lowe was a curate at Shelsley Beauchamp, Worcestershire, in 1810. In 1812 he had a post as domestic chaplain with Henry Hall Gage, 4th Viscount Gage, and in 1814 another curacy, at Diddlebury in Shropshire. In 1820 he became vicar of Grimley, Worcestershire. He was rector of Holy Trinity, Exeter from 1837 to 1840, and Dean of Exeter from 1839 for the rest of his life.

He published in 1825 An essay on the absolving power of the Church.

Family
Lowe married in 1808 Ellen Lucy Pardoe (died 1843), eldest daughter of George Pardoe of Nash Court, Shropshire. Their children were:

Lucy (died 1865 at age 56), married in 1828 Rev. Thomas James Rocke, as his first wife
Helen (died 1881 at age 72), unmarried
Thomas Lowe (born 1811, died in Australia)
George Lowe (1813–1885), cleric, married 1842 Louisa, youngest daughter of Thomas Crookenden of Rushford Hall, Suffolk
Arthur Lowe (1814–1882), naval officer, married: 1848 Katharina Ommaney, youngest daughter of John Acworth Ommanney R.N.; 1858 Florence Strode, younger daughter of George Strode of Newnham Park, Devon; 1864 Elizabeth Henrietta, eldest daughter of Henry Ducie Chads, R.N.
Herbert Lowe, baptised 1816
Noel Lowe (1817–1857), cleric, married 1847 Louisa Julia, younger daughter of John Moore-Stevens of Winscott, Devon
Anna, baptised 1819, died unmarried 1880
Emma, baptised 1821, died unmarried 1892
Harriet, baptised 1822, died unmarried 1898.

References

1781 births
1861 deaths
Deans of Exeter